Saint Crescentinus (died  June 1, 303) is the patron saint of Urbino whose feast day is celebrated on June 1. Venerated as a warrior saint, he is sometimes depicted on horseback, killing a dragon, in the same manner as Saint George.  However, as Martin Davies writes, "S. Crescentino’s story, so far as I am aware, excludes a Princess or other female victim."

Legend
Crescentinus is traditionally said to have been a Roman soldier who converted to Christianity.  To escape the persecutions of Diocletian, he fled to Umbria, and found refuge at Thifernum Tiberinum (present-day Città di Castello). His defeat of a dragon led to a successful evangelization of the region, together with his companions.  His mission was confined particularly to the Tiber valley and the ancient Thifernum Tiberinum. He was subsequently beheaded.

Veneration
Wishing to enrich his cathedral, Blessed Mainard (Mainardo), the Bishop of Urbino, brought the saint's relics to the city in 1068.

The coin known as the armellino (popularly called the volpetta) issued by the Duke of Urbino, Francesco Maria I della Rovere, featured Saint Crescentinus on horseback.

He is still venerated in Urbino, where his statue is carried through the streets in a procession on his feast day. Another ritual involves tapping devotees’ heads with Crescentinus' relics, to free the supplicant from headaches.

Gallery

External links
 San Crescentino
 L'omelia di S.E.R. il Cardinale Sergio Sebastiani

Notes

Further reading

Information about this saint may be found in the Acta Sanctorum, as well as in Angelo Conti, Fiori Vaghi delle Vite dei Santi e Beati delle Chiese, e Reliquie della Città di Castello (1627), pp-45ff.

303 deaths
4th-century Christian martyrs
4th-century Romans
Year of birth unknown
Military saints